The 10th StarDance series was premiered on October 12, 2019 and ended on December 14, 2019. Hosts in this series are again Marek Eben and Tereza Kostková. Jury Radek Balaš was replaced by Richard Genzer, Václav Kuneš by Jan Tománek.

Competitors

References

External links
 Official website

10
2019 Czech television seasons